Kouaoua (in Ajië: Kaa Wi Paa; in Corsican: Quaua) is a commune in the North Province of New Caledonia, an overseas territory of France in the Pacific Ocean. Nickel mining is operated in Kouaoua.

History
The commune of Kouaoua was created on 25 April 1995 by detaching its territory from the commune of Canala.

References

Communes of New Caledonia